Aranarache  is a town and municipality located in the province and autonomous community of Navarre, northern Spain.

Aranarache has a population of 86 inhabitants. It is located below the Arnotegi peak, Urbasa range.

References

External links
 ARANARACHE in the Bernardo Estornés Lasa - Auñamendi Encyclopedia (Euskomedia Fundazioa) 

Municipalities in Navarre